Dalton is a hamlet and census-designated place (CDP) in the towns of Nunda and Portage in Livingston County, New York, United States. The population was 362 at the 2010 census.

Geography
Dalton is in southwestern Livingston County, primarily in the southwestern part of the town of Nunda, with a small portion crossing into the southeastern part of the town of Portage. New York State Route 70 passes through the northern part of the community, leading northwest  to Portageville and southeast  to Canaseraga. State Route 408 leads north from SR 70  to the village of Nunda.

The western edge of the CDP is Keshequa Creek, a northward-flowing tributary of Canaseraga Creek and part of the Genesee River watershed.

Demographics

References 

Hamlets in New York (state)
Census-designated places in New York (state)
Census-designated places in Livingston County, New York
Hamlets in Livingston County, New York